Yngve Johansson is a Swedish former footballer who played as a forward.

References

Association football forwards
Swedish footballers
Allsvenskan players
Malmö FF players
Living people
Year of birth missing (living people)